Pedobacter arcticus is a species of facultative psychrophile bacteria isolated from Arctic soil. It is gram-negative, short rod-shaped and motile (by gliding), with type strain A12(T) ( = CCTCC AB 2010223(T) = NRRL B-59457(T)). Its genome has been sequenced.

References

Further reading
Whitman, William B., et al., eds. Bergey's manual® of systematic bacteriology. Vol. 5. Springer, 2012.

External links

LPSN
Type strain of Pedobacter arcticus at BacDive -  the Bacterial Diversity Metadatabase

Sphingobacteriia
Bacteria described in 2011